pH10 is an electronica jungle/drum n bass group currently based in Denver, Colorado and has been churning out records since the late 1990s. Most notably, pH10 was honored as the First Place winner of Jive Magazine's International Songwriting Competition 2005  for the track "Tell Me Why" - a collaboration with hip hop vocalist Pete Miser. pH10's latest recording, "Well Connected" has been called in a Jive Magazine review " the nastiest, noisiest, scariest, loudest and by far the heaviest..."

Biography
pH10 was started by founding members Recone F. Helmut and Clark ov Saturn after they split from industrial rock band, LD-50. Their debut release, "Recone Helmut vs. Clark ov Saturn" was one of the Denver Westword's "20 best recordings to come out of Denver in 1998".
Shortly thereafter, Helmut and Saturn signed with Mutant Sound System/ Trumystic Records, toured with Dr. Israel and the Trumystic Sound System throughout Europe, and then relocated to Brooklyn, NY. Saturn eventually split and started working in minimal techno group Socks and Sandals with Nicolas Sauser. Helmut continued to produce albums with vocalist Pete Miser and his new partner, SyBO. pH10 returned to Colorado in 2005.

Current members
Recone F. Helmut, SyBO, Pete Miser

Discography

Albums
Well Connected (Helmutplex Records, 2008, Denver)
Helmutvision (Helmutplex Records, 2004, Brooklyn, NY)
Quarks and Gluons (Helmutplex Records, 2002, Brooklyn, NY)
Sci-Fidelity (Freedomzone, 2000, Brooklyn, NY)

Singles/EP's
Needless to Say (feat. Pete Miser) (Helmutplex Records, 2003, Brooklyn, NY)
Defender (Terraform Records, 2002, Denver, CO)
Recone Helmut vs. Clark ov Saturn (pH10, 1997, Denver, CO)

Compilations
BK United - The Pete Miser Files (Helmutplex Records, 2006, Brooklyn, NY)
System Evolution (Terraform Records, 2000, Denver, CO)

Productions on other artists' recordings
Soothsayer "Zen Turtle" - Track: "The Business" (Trumystic Records, 1999, Brooklyn, NY)
Dr. Israel "Inna City Pressure" - Track: "Crisis Time" (Trumystic Records, 1999, Brooklyn, NY)

Past Collaborators
Clark ov Saturn

External links
 pH10 Official Homepage
 pH10 live in Vienna (video on ZipZapZop.com)

Articles and Reviews
  pH10 Press site
  Westword review of Helmutvision
Westword Review of debut EP "Recone Helmut vs. Clark ov Saturn

References

Electronic music groups from Colorado
American drum and bass musical groups
Musical groups from Denver